Neil Gaiman: Dream Dangerously is a feature-length documentary that takes an in depth look at the life, career and mind of the English fantasy writer Neil Gaiman. Dream Dangerously follows Gaiman on his 2013 signing tour, and also delves into his creative process and personal background. It includes interviews with friends artists, editors and other industry professionals.

Background

Dream Dangerously is co-produced by Sequart and Respect Films. The film grew out of preview collaborations Grant Morrison: Talking With Gods and Warren Ellis: Captured Ghosts. The team felt that Gaiman would be a perfect subject for a next project. At the time, Gaiman was preparing for his final signing tour, which became one of the central subjects of the documentary.

Meaney and Rennert followed Gaiman on his tour in the US and through all of England. This footage became the spine of the film.

This material was supplemented with interviews with Gaiman's collaborators, like DC editor Karen Berger, author Terry Pratchett, as well as his friends and fans like Bill Hader, Michael Sheen, Geoffrey Notkin, and Lenny Henry.

Plot

The film follows Neil on his final book signing tour, across the US and UK. While dealing with the challenges of his extensive tour, he reflects on his youth, early creative success and the struggles of balancing creativity and life.

Release

The film was acquired for distribution by Vimeo, and released in July 2016. It is currently available on Vimeo on Demand and Starz. A Blu-Ray edition was released in September 2018 by Brink Vision.

See also
 Grant Morrison: Talking With Gods
 Warren Ellis: Captured Ghosts
 She Makes Comics

References

Further reading

External links
 
 Talking with Gods on producer Sequart's site

Documentary films about comics
Neil Gaiman
2010s English-language films